Tashan-E-Ishq  is an Indian romantic drama television series created by Subhash Chandra under Essel Vision Productions that replaced Jodha Akbar and aired from 10 August 2015 to 16 September 2016. It was replaced by Zindagi Ki Mehek.  

The series starred Sidhant Gupta, Jasmin Bhasin and Zain Imam as Kunj Sarna, Twinkle Taneja and Yuvraj  "Yuvi" Luthra. Set in the backdrop of Punjab, it revolved around their lives and relationship of love, hatred, betrayal and obsession. The International title for this serial is Fire and Ice broadcast on Zee World.

Plot

Twinkle Taneja and Yuvraj Luthra madly fall in love. Their respective mothers Leela Taneja and Anita Luthra, are rivals. During a fight between Leela and Anita, Leela challenges her that she will get a wedding alliance for Twinkle in 5 days. Twinkle is upset and meets Yuvraj, he suggests that they should elope.  Leela wants Twinkle to marry another guy Kunj Sarna, so Manohar Sarna and Leela Taneja meet for their kid's alliance.  

Twinkle packs her bag and has made her mind up to leave her home and run away with Yuvraj. She then realizes that she was being selfish, and if she had gone further with the plan it would hurt her mother, whom she loves, and she decides not to elope with Yuvi. Yuvraj is very angry with her decision and breaks up with her. Twinkle's alliance is fixed with Kunj Sarna. She decides to sort it out with Yuvi but they get into an argument. 

Manohar meets Kunj and scolds him for not being at the home during the party. Manohar is a short-tempered person and a dominating husband he is also very religious. Kunj's mother dislikes Twinkle as they had a bad interaction the first time they met and got into a misunderstanding.

Yuvi is upset at seeing Kunj and Twinkle together at the party. Yuvi and Twinkle patch up. Kunj pretends to be a cheap and characterless boy so he drives Twinkle away as he is in love with Alisha. Twinkle tells her mother how Kunj is a creep but Leela refuses to believe her. 
Everyone proceeds with the Roka, this makes Yuvi angry. 

Twinkle, Kunj, and Yuvraj have their plan to break the Roka but all of them fail in stopping the Roka. The next day Manohar scolds Usha(Kunj's mother) and Kunj for what happened on the Roka. Kunj drives his bike in anger and Yuvi follows him. They eventually get into a fight but Twinkle arrives disrupting the fight. Three of them reveal that none of them want this marriage. 

They then decide to tell their families about their decision. They fail to express their feelings when their wedding date is being fixed. Yuvraj vows that he will not let Twinkle go and says that he will make Twinkle his no matter what.

Twinkle and Kunj make a deal that they will be together for 3 months and then they will go on their separate ways. Yuvi is on and off about this plan as he doesn't trust Kunj. Alisha is appointed as the wedding planner for Kunj-Twinkle's wedding. She initially denies having feelings for Kunj to Twinkle. She has an ulterior motive to have Kunj all to herself, which means that she wants him to leave his family because she doesn't want to share Kunj or his wealth with anyone. 

As the engagement day comes, Twinkle, Kunj, and Yuvraj worry.
Later, it is revealed that Yuvraj is faking love and wants to destroy Twinkle to take revenge on Leela for Anita. Twinkle is engaged with Kunj. Twinkle exposes Alisha to Kunj. Yuvraj plans to stop the wedding he crosses all the limits but fails each time. Twinkle marries Kunj. A guilty Twinkle decides to tell her mother the truth. 

Leela is very upset to know about Twinkle's confession. Anita and Yuvraj brainwash Leela against Twinkle. When Twinkle confronts her mother, she faces her mother's rage. Kunj reaches the scene and tries to handle the situation but Leela asks Kunj to take Twinkle away.

Ishaan goes missing and Twinkle is blamed. Twinkle goes to Yuvraj to question him about the kidnapping. Twinkle and Kunj learn that it wasn't him who kidnapped Ishaan. The Sarnas learn that Ishaan was kidnapped because of the loan taken by Manohar. The Sarna's now face a financial crisis. Twinkle goes missing but is it later revealed that she fainted doing Parikrama and has dengue so she is admitted to the hospital. 

Kunj cares for Twinkle which upsets Usha. Manohar's brother and mother come to live with them. Surjeet falls in love with Anita and decides to marry her even when everyone opposed this alliance. Kunj and Twinkle decide to stop this marriage but they fail. They are sent to Goa for their honeymoon, Yuvraj follows them and has an altercation with Kunj.

Yuvraj realizes he is really in love with Twinkle now. Yuvraj tries to create problems in Twinkle's life and kill Kunj. Twinkle and Kunj fall in love and want a happy life. But Yuvraj remains a threat to them and keeps interfering in their lives. Drawing strength from each other, Kunj and Twinkle fight Yuvraj's all intentions. 

Things take a turn when Twinkle saves his life when he falls into his trap of killing her. Yuvraj changes the heart. Owing to hatred for Leela, Anita tries to ruin Twinkle's life by murdering Kunj. She gets him a shot. Kunj is missing and presumed dead. It later revealed that he never died and was saved by some fishermen. Presuming Kunj is dead, Twinkle is shattered. After a few months, she finds out she is pregnant with Kunj's child. Her family gets her married to Yuvraj fakely as he has changed, but Twinkle continues to love Kunj.

5 years later

Twinkle has suffered miscarriage and still lives with Yuvraj, unaware of his unconditional love for her. Kunj assumes the name Rocky Singh and is a successful boxer. Twinkle and Yuvraj suspect that Rocky might be Kunj. Kunj makes a fake MMS of Twinkle seducing him before she finally confronts him and narrates her sorrows after he presumably died. She tells him about her miscarriage, why she married Yuvraj, and their marriage is fake. Kunj breaks down and tries to win Twinkle's trust back. She is confused as she develops feelings for Yuvraj too and doesn’t want to leave him midway. She now spends some time alone, flees to Mussoorie, and meets a carefree Sonia. Kunj and Yuvraj follow Twinkle, individually trying to win her heart. She decides to study further and demands some space. Yuvraj protectively keeps an eye on Twinkle so that she doesn’t get into any problem. Kunj gets admission into the college as a coach.
Yuvraj disguises himself as Jassi and befriends Twinkle to stay close to her as he fears losing her more than ever because this time, his love was pure and more selfless than the last time.   As luck has it, Twinkle and Kunj get closer which Yuvraj and Pallavi are unlike. Out of jealousy and his immense love for twinkle, Yuvraj begins plotting against Kunj and tries to instigate Twinkle against him. She professes her belief in Kunj, upsetting Yuvraj further. After many difficulties, Kunj and Twinkle decide to remarry, upsetting Pallavi and Yuvraj. Pallavi pretends to commit suicide to stop the wedding but is killed by her servants for money. Twinkle and Kunj are blamed for the murder, but Yuvraj and a girl named Simple Singh work to prove the couple's innocence and fall in love. The show ends with Kunj-Twinkle and Yuvraj-Simple's marriage and thus ends the saga of Yuvraj and Twinkle’s Tashan-e-Ishq though they end up with different people.

Cast

Main

Jasmin Bhasin as Twinkle Taneja Sarna/Luthra (née) Taneja: Leela and Raminder's daughter, Mahi's Elder sister, Yuvi's ex-lover turned wife ; Kunj's wife (2015–16)
Sidhant Gupta as Kunj Sarna: Usha and Manohar's son, Anand's brother, Twinkle's husband (2015–16)
Naman Shaw replaced Gupta as Kunj (2016)
Zain Imam as Yuvraj "Yuvi" Luthra: Anita and Akshay's son, Surjeet's step-son , Mahi ex-husband ; Twinkle's ex-lover turned husband;  Simple's husband (2015–16)
Neha Narang as Simple Luthra (née) Singh: Yuvi's Second wife (2016)

Recurring
Vaishnavi Mahant as Leela Taneja (née) Oberoi: Raman's sister, Raminder's wife, Twinkle and Mahi's mother (2015–16)
Eva Grover/Anjali Mukhi as Anita Luthra / Anita Sarna (née) Raichand: Akshay's widow, Surjeet's wife, Yuvi's mother (2015–16)
Tanushree Kaushal as Nirmala Sarna alias Bebe: Surjeet and Manohar's sister, Kunj, Anand and Cherry's Paternal aunt (2015–16)
 Aditi Bhatia as Babli Oberoi Taneja ; Twinkle's Cousin . (2015)
Deepika Amin as Usha Sarna: Manohar's wife, Kunj and Anand's mother (2015–16)
Bobby Parvez as Manohar Sarna: Nirmala and Surjeet's brother, Usha's husband, Kunj and Anand's father (2015–16)
Jatin Sial as Raminder Taneja alias RT: Leela's husband, Twinkle and Mahi's father (2015–16)
Nasirr Khan as Surjeet Sarna: Nirmala and Manohar's brother, Anokhi's former and Anita's second husband, Cherry's father, Yuvi's step-father, Kunj and Anand's uncle (2015–16)
Sonika Chopra as Pinni Oberoi: Raman's wife, Twinkle and Mahi's aunt (2015–16)
Ashwin Kaushal as Raman Oberoi: Leela's brother, Pinni's husband, Twinkle and Mahi's uncle (2015–16)
Vishal Gupta as Anand Sarna: Usha and Manohar's son, Kunj's brother, Nikki's husband (2015–16)
Raj Singh as Cherry Sarna: Anokhi and Surjeet's son, Kunj and Anand's cousin, Anita's step-son (2016)
Simran Sharma as Chinki ; Twinkle and Yuvi's Best - Friend (2015-2016)
Anannya Kolvankar as Prisha (2015–16)
Rishina Kandhari as Nikki Sarna: Anand's wife (2015)
Ram Sethi as Suryendra alias Nanaji: Preeto's husband (2015)
Beena Banerjee as Preeto: Owner of Ms. Amritsar, Suryendra's wife (2015)
Sonica D'Souza as Alisha (2015)
Abhilash Chaudhary as Rocky Singh: Kunj's manager and friend (2016) 
 Ajit singh Hada as sonu oberoi: babli oberoi's brother ( 2016 )
Apoorv Singh as Sunny Bhalla 
Charu Asopa as Dr. Pallavi Chaddha: Kunj's friend (2016)
Shritama Mukherjee as Devika Khanna/Mahi Luthra (Nee'Taneja ): Leela and Raminder's daughter, Twinkle's Younger sister, Yuvi's first wife(2016)
Priya Shinde as Maya:Kunj's best friend(2016)

Guest appearances
 Aashish Kaul as Dr. Akshay Luthra: Anita's former husband, Yuvi's father (Episode:51) (2015)
 Mika Singh as Ms. Amritsar Judge (2015)
 Shah Rukh Khan, Kajol, Varun Dhawan, Kriti Sanon to promote Dilwale (2015)
 Mouni Roy for dance performance in new year party (2015)
 Sanjeeda Sheikh and Aamir Ali for dance performance in Twinkle and Kunj's one of the wedding ceremonies(2016)
 Sukirti Kandpal as Rajjo (2016)
 Nia Sharma and Ravi Dubey (2016) as Sidarth and Roshni Khurana from Jamai Raja, Sidarth attended all the Rituals of Twinkle and Kunj wedding , he Saved Kunj from Yuvi's Plan.
Ahmad Harhash as Yuvraj (2016)

Production and broadcast 

The show was produced by Subhash Chandra and aired on Zee TV from 10 August 2015 to 16 September 2016. The show replaced the popular historical series Jodha Akbar.

In South africa, it airs as Fire and Ice on Zee World and Dare To Love on eExtra.
In Pakistan, it airs on Aplus. As from 13 September.
The show have air on MBC Digital 4 in Mauritius.
It airs in Kenya dubbed in English as Forever Yours on Ebru TV Kenya.
In Sub-Saharan Africa it airs on eAfrica on DSTV Channel 250 and on GOTV Channel 120.
In France it is airs as Le Combat Pour Amour

Awards

Soundtrack
The soundtrack of the show consists of two songs. The first song is named "Tashan E Ishq" (title song of the show) and is sung by Arpita Chakraborty showing Yuvi and Twinkle Love story . The second song "Sajna Ve" is sung by Mamta Raut, Rahul Pandit and Altamash Faridi.

International broadcasting

References

2015 Indian television series debuts
2016 Indian television series endings
Hindi-language television shows
Indian drama television series
Television shows set in Punjab, India
Zee TV original programming